Torrecilla or Torrecillas may refer to:

Places

Puerto Rico
 Torrecilla Alta, Canóvanas, Puerto Rico, a barrio
 Torrecilla Alta, Loíza, Puerto Rico, a barrio
 Torrecillas, Morovis, Puerto Rico, a barrio

Spain

 La Torrecilla, a mountain in Andalusia
 Torrecilla de la Abadesa, a town in the province of Valladolid, Castile and León
 Torrecilla de Alcañiz, a town in the province of Teruel, Aragon
 Torrecilla sobre Alesanco, a village in the province La Rioja
 Torrecilla de los Ángeles, a town in the province of Cáceres, Extremadura
 Torrecilla de la Jara, a town in the province of Toledo, Castile-La Mancha
 Torrecilla en Cameros, a village in the province La Rioja
 Torrecilla del Monte, a town in the province of Burgos, Castile and León
 Torrecilla de la Orden, a town in the province of Valladolid, Castile and León
 Torrecilla del Pinar, a town in the province of Segovia, Castile and León
 Torrecilla del Rebollar, a town in the province of Teruel, Aragon
 Torrecilla de la Torre, a town in the province of Valladolid, Castile and León
 Torrecillas de la Tiesa, a town in the province of Cáceres, Extremadura

People

 Rubén Torrecilla (born 1979), a Spanish footballer